"Ljudet av ett annat hjärta", written by Per Gessle and Mats "MP" Persson, is a song recorded by  Swedish pop group Gyllene Tider, released as a single on 24 October 1981. It peaked at number three on the Swedish Singles Chart. The song became a Svensktoppen hit for nine weeks between 14 February and 14 April 1982, peaking at number six.

Single track listing
"Ljudet av ett annat hjärta" - 3:50
"Teena" - 6.05

English
The song was also recorded with lyrics in English, as "Fever in the Night".

Charts

References

External links
 Gyllene Tiders discography
 Elektroniska tider - Ljudet av ett annat hjärta

1981 singles
Gyllene Tider songs
Songs written by Per Gessle
Swedish-language songs
1981 songs
Songs written by Mats Persson (musician)